Resistencia Aeroclub Airport  is a rural airport  southwest of Resistencia, a city in the Chaco Province of Argentina.

See also

Transport in Argentina
List of airports in Argentina

References

External links 
OpenStreetMap - Aeroclub Airport
OurAirports - Aeroclub Chaco Airport

Airports in Argentina
Chaco Province